Mayfair is a suburb of Hastings City, in the Hawke's Bay Region of New Zealand's North Island.

Nine streets in the suburb have poppies on their street signs to commemorate New Zealanders who served in international conflicts.

Demographics

Mayfair had a population of 2,979 at the 2018 New Zealand census, an increase of 291 people (10.8%) since the 2013 census, and an increase of 348 people (13.2%) since the 2006 census. There were 960 households, comprising 1,464 males and 1,512 females, giving a sex ratio of 0.97 males per female. The median age was 33.1 years (compared with 37.4 years nationally), with 732 people (24.6%) aged under 15 years, 633 (21.2%) aged 15 to 29, 1,212 (40.7%) aged 30 to 64, and 399 (13.4%) aged 65 or older.

Ethnicities were 63.5% European/Pākehā, 40.6% Māori, 8.8% Pacific peoples, 7.5% Asian, and 2.4% other ethnicities. People may identify with more than one ethnicity.

The percentage of people born overseas was 13.5, compared with 27.1% nationally.

Although some people chose not to answer the census's question about religious affiliation, 46.5% had no religion, 35.4% were Christian, 4.9% had Māori religious beliefs, 1.0% were Hindu, 1.6% were Muslim, 0.5% were Buddhist and 3.1% had other religions.

Of those at least 15 years old, 207 (9.2%) people had a bachelor's or higher degree, and 561 (25.0%) people had no formal qualifications. The median income was $23,400, compared with $31,800 nationally. 135 people (6.0%) earned over $70,000 compared to 17.2% nationally. The employment status of those at least 15 was that 1,086 (48.3%) people were employed full-time, 297 (13.2%) were part-time, and 102 (4.5%) were unemployed.

Education

References

Suburbs of Hastings, New Zealand